Sergio Uñac (born 15 February 1970) is an Argentine politician who serves as governor of the San Juan Province.

Biography
Sergio Uñac was born at Pocito on February 15, 1970. He is the son of the former mayor of Pocito Joaquín Uñac and he is of Lebanese descent by his mother side. He attended primary school at the Antonino Aberastain school, and ended high school education in 1987. He studied law at the National University of Córdoba and graduated as a lawyer in 1994. He was a member of the Juventud Universitaria Peronista during that time.

He was elected mayor of Pocito in 2003, and was reelected in 2007. He became vicegobernor in 2011, under José Luis Gioja. When Gioja was hospitalised following a plane crash, Uñac became the new interim governor on October 11, 2013. He led the state funeral for deputy Margarita Ferrá de Bartol, who died in the plane crash, and asked the population to stay calm and continue working as usual, despite of the unprecedented event in the province. During his tenure he faced union requests from the vintners and medics. He negotiated with Barrick Gold in November, to prevent the corporation from leaving its operations in San Juan. In December, he dealt with police revolts, solved by increasing the police's wages. Gioja was rehabilitated on February 8, 2014, after 121 days of Uñac in government.

Unable to run for a new term, Gioja proposed Uñac as the new governor, in light of the good results of his brief tenure as interim governor. He was elected governor in the 2015 elections. His victory was well received by the mining and wine production sectors of the province.

References

External links

 Government of San Juan 

Governors of San Juan Province, Argentina
Vice Governors of San Juan Province, Argentina
Justicialist Party politicians
Argentine people of Lebanese descent
National University of Córdoba alumni
Living people
1970 births